Police Car 17 is a 1933 American pre-Code crime film directed by Lambert Hillyer and starring Tim McCoy, Evalyn Knapp and Edwin Maxwell.

Cast
 Tim McCoy as Tim Conlon
 Evalyn Knapp as Helen Regan
 Edwin Maxwell as Big Bill Standish
 Ward Bond as Bumps O'Neill
 DeWitt Jennings as Captain T. J. Hart
 Wallis Clark as Lt. Dan Regan
 Harold Huber as Johnny Davis
 Wally Albright as Jimmy
 Jack Long as Ace Boyle
 Charles West as Harry (as Charlie West)
 Jessie Arnold as Neighbor (uncredited)
 Selmer Jackson as Police Radio Dispatcher (uncredited)
 Tom London as	Police Detective (uncredited)

References

Bibliography
 Alan G. Fetrow. Sound films, 1927-1939: a United States Filmography. McFarland, 1992.

External links
 

1933 films
1933 crime films
American mystery films
Films directed by Lambert Hillyer
Columbia Pictures films
American black-and-white films
1930s English-language films
1930s American films